Marshall Teague may refer to:

Marshall Teague (racing driver) (1921–1959), American racecar champion
Marshall Teague (actor) (born 1953), American film and television performer